The Nintendo Player’s Guides are a series of video game strategy guides from Nintendo based on Nintendo Power magazine.

Original format
The first Player's Guide was simply named  The Official Nintendo Player's Guide, featuring dozens of different NES games. The following 22 games were covered in depth, with enemy descriptions, level maps, and strategy tips.

 The Legend of Zelda
 Mike Tyson's Punch Out!!
 Commando
 Super Mario Bros.
 Top Gun
 Ghosts and Goblins
 Double Dribble
 Zelda II: The Adventure of Link
 Metroid
 Rad Racer
 Ring King
 Kid Icarus
 Pro Wrestling
 Castlevania
 Excitebike
 Arkanoid
 Rush'n Attack
 Rygar
 Ikari Warriors
 Spy Hunter
 The Goonies 2
 Kung Fu

Screenshots and short descriptions of other games were also included.

The Official Nintendo Player's Guide was followed in the early 1990s by a number of publications, which were produced under the slightly different moniker of Nintendo Power Strategy Guides. These were sent between the then bi-monthly magazine issues to subscribers or mailed alongside them. Nintendo Entertainment System games covered by their Strategy Guides included:

 Super Mario Bros. 3
 Ninja Gaiden II: The Dark Sword of Chaos
 Final Fantasy
 4-Player Extra, which covered multiple four-player games on the NES

Nintendo ceased production of these bimonthly Strategy Guides due to a lack of important game releases in the pre-holiday seasons of the year.

Player's Guide
After converting Nintendo Power to a monthly format came the more well-known mainstay of Player's Guides. Early guides covered groups of games in one book. These books covered strategy for:

 NES Game Atlas
 Castlevania
 Castlevania II: Simon's Quest
 Castlevania III: Dracula's Curse
 Chip 'n Dale Rescue Rangers
 DuckTales
 The Legend of Zelda
 Mega Man
 Mega Man 2
 Mega Man 3
 Ninja Gaiden
 Ninja Gaiden II
 StarTropics
 Super Mario Bros.
 Super Mario Bros. 2
 Super Mario Bros. 3
 Teenage Mutant Ninja Turtles
 Teenage Mutant Ninja Turtles II: The Arcade Game
 Zelda II: The Adventure of Link

 Game Boy
 Batman
 Castlevania: The Adventure
 Cosmo Tank
 Days of Thunder
 Double Dragon
 Dr. Mario
 DuckTales
 F-1 Race
 Final Fantasy Legend
 Fortified Zone
 Gargoyle's Quest
 Golf
 Gremlins 2: The New Batch
 The Hunt for Red October
 Kwirk
 Nemesis
 Operation C
 Quarth
 R-Type
 Revenge of the 'Gator
 Super Mario Land
 Teenage Mutant Ninja Turtles: Fall of the Foot Clan
 SolarStriker
 Solomon's Club
 Super R.C. Pro-Am
 Sword of Hope
 Tetris
 Ultima: Runes of Virtue

 Mario Mania
 Super Mario World, along with a history of the character, Mario.

 Super Nintendo Entertainment System
 ActRaiser
 Bill Laimbeer's Combat Basketball
 The Chessmaster
 Darius Twin
 Drakkhen
 Extra Innings
 F-Zero
 Final Fantasy II
 Final Fight
 Gradius III
 Home Alone
 HyperZone
 Joe & Mac
 John Madden's Football
 Hal's Hole in One Golf
 Lagoon
 Legend of the Mystical Ninja
 The Legend of Zelda: A Link to the Past
 Miracle Piano Teaching System
 Nolan Ryan's Baseball
 Paperboy 2
 Pilotwings
 Pit Fighter
 Populous
 RPM Racing
 SimCity
 Smash TV
 Super Bases Loaded
 Super Baseball Simulator 1.000
 Super CastleVania IV
 Super Ghouls 'n Ghosts
 Super Mario World
 Super Off-Road
 Super R-Type
 Super Tennis
 True Golf Classics: Waialae Country Club
 Ultraman: Towards the Future
 U.N. Squadron
 Ys III: Wanderers from Ys

 Top Secret: Passwords

Outside of offering an optional Player's Guide as a free gift for a Nintendo Power subscription or subscription renewal, Nintendo Power did not include Player's Guides with the magazine. They were, however, made available separately, both through mail-order and at book and video-game shops. Nintendo did also once offer a subscription motive that included four of the aforementioned Player's Guides instead of only one.

Following these four Player's Guides, a fifth was released to Nintendo Power subscribers entitled Top Secret Passwords, containing passwords for a wide variety of NES, SNES, and Game Boy games. While initially billed as a subscriber exclusive, this guide was eventually sold at retailers.

Later era
In its later years, each Player's Guide published features one specific game, much like the earlier Nintendo Power Strategy Guides. These Nintendo Power branded Player's Guides were available (with the exception of the Square-published Chrono Trigger) only for Nintendo-published games, but the concept is now emulated by other publishing companies such as Brady Games or Prima for major releases on all video game consoles. Almost all major video games released today will have one or more official Guides associated with them.

While the rise of the World Wide Web and the increasing availability of free on-line FAQs and walkthroughs has taken away some of the need for commercial strategy guides, there is still a market for them. Guides often feature extensive picture-by-picture walkthroughs, maps, game art, and other visual features that cannot be provided by a bare text online walkthrough.

Among the games that have been given Nintendo Player's Guides:

 Animal Crossing
 Animal Crossing: Wild World
 Advance Wars: Dual Strike
 Advance Wars 2 Black Hole Rising
 Banjo-Kazooie
 Banjo-Tooie
 Battalion Wars
 Chrono Trigger
 Conker's Bad Fur Day
 Diddy Kong Racing
 Donkey Kong 64
 Donkey Kong Country
 Donkey Kong Country (Game Boy Advance version)
 Donkey Kong Country 2: Diddy's Kong Quest
 Donkey Kong Country 3: Dixie Kong's Double Trouble!
 EarthBound
 Eternal Darkness: Sanity's Requiem
 Final Fantasy I & II: Dawn of Souls
 Final Fantasy III (VI)
 Final Fantasy IV Advance
 Final Fantasy V Advance
 Final Fantasy Crystal Chronicles
 Final Fantasy Tactics Advance
 Fire Emblem (Game Boy Advance version)
 Fire Emblem: Path of Radiance
 Fire Emblem: The Sacred Stones
 F-Zero GX
 GoldenEye 007
 Golden Sun: The Lost Age
 Jet Force Gemini
 Killer Instinct
 The Legend of Zelda: Collector's Edition
 The Legend of Zelda: Four Swords Adventures
 The Legend of Zelda: Link's Awakening
 The Legend of Zelda: A Link to the Past
 The Legend of Zelda: A Link to the Past/Four Swords
 The Legend of Zelda: Majora's Mask
 The Legend of Zelda: The Minish Cap
 The Legend of Zelda: Ocarina of Time
 The Legend of Zelda: Oracle of Seasons and Oracle of Ages
 The Legend of Zelda: Twilight Princess
 The Legend of Zelda: The Wind Waker
 Luigi's Mansion
 Mario & Luigi: Partners in Time
 Mario & Luigi: Superstar Saga
 Mario Kart 64
 Mario Kart: Double Dash!!
 Mario Paint
 Metroid Fusion
 Metroid Prime
 Metroid Prime 2: Echoes
 Metroid Prime Hunters
 Metroid: Zero Mission
 New Super Mario Bros.
 Nintendogs
 Paper Mario
 Paper Mario: The Thousand-Year Door
 Perfect Dark
 Pikmin
 Pikmin 2
 Pokémon Battle Revolution
 Pokémon Colosseum
 Pokémon Crystal
 Pokémon Diamond and Pearl
 Pokémon Emerald
 Pokémon FireRed and LeafGreen
 Pokémon Gold and Silver
 Pokémon Mystery Dungeon
 Pokémon Ranger
 Pokémon Red and Blue
 Pokémon Ruby and Sapphire
 Pokémon Snap
 Pokémon Stadium
 Pokémon Stadium 2
 Pokémon Trading Card Game
 Pokémon Special Edition: Red, Blue & Yellow
 Pokémon XD: Gale of Darkness
 Star Fox 64
 Star Fox Adventures
 Star Fox Assault
 Star Wars: Episode I Racer
 Star Wars: Rogue Squadron
 Star Wars: Rogue Squadron II: Rogue Leader
 Star Wars: Rogue Squadron III: Rebel Strike
 Street Fighter II Turbo
 Super Game Boy
 Super Mario 64
 Super Mario Advance 4: Super Mario Bros. 3
 Super Mario All-Stars
 Super Mario RPG: Legend of the Seven Stars
 Super Mario Sunshine
 Super Mario World 2: Yoshi's Island
 Super Metroid
 Super Paper Mario
 Super Smash Bros. Melee
 Sword of Mana
 Wario World
 Wave Race: Blue Storm
 Yoshi's Island DS
 Yoshi's Island: Super Mario Advance 3
 Yoshi's Story

Discontinuation

Around mid-2007, Nintendo discontinued the series after the publication of the guide for Pokémon Battle Revolution.

This end of guide production was apparently due to the impending switch from in-house publication of NP to publication by Future US, which occurred in November 2007.

In an issue of Nintendo Power, an NP subscriber wrote to Nintendo, asking about the status of the Player's Guide series. Nintendo replied that the series is indeed discontinued indefinitely. They also pointed out that Prima Games was their official partner for making strategy guides, which they have been making for the aforementioned recent releases. Additionally, Prima made special strategy guides for The Legend of Zelda: Phantom Hourglass and Mario Kart Wii. These guides were released exclusively as bonuses for Nintendo Power subscriptions or renewals. These guides even carry the label "Special Digest Version: Supplement to Nintendo Power Magazine".

See also
 Game Boy line
 Nintendo DS
 Nintendo Entertainment System
 Nintendo GameCube
 Nintendo 64
 Super Nintendo Entertainment System
 Wii

External links
 Archived Nintendo Player’s Guide on the Internet Archive

Books about video games
Handbooks and manuals
Nintendo publications
Video game magazines published in the United States